Mozelos may refer to the following places in Portugal:

Mozelos (Paredes de Coura), a parish in the municipality of Paredes de Coura
Mozelos (Santa Maria da Feira), a parish in the municipality of Santa Maria da Feira